Crestview Local School District may refer to:

Crestview Local School District (Columbiana County), Ohio
Crestview Local School District (Richland County), Ohio
Crestview Local School District (Van Wert County), Ohio